Joseph Engel is a French child actor. He is most noted for his performance as Bastien in the 2022 film Falcon Lake, for which he received a Canadian Screen Award nomination for Best Lead Performance in a Film at the 11th Canadian Screen Awards in 2023.

He previously appeared in the films A Faithful Man (L'Homme fidèle) and The Crusade (La Croisade).

References

External links

21st-century French male actors
French male child actors
French male film actors
Living people